Susan Innes (4 May 1948 – 24 February 2005) was a British journalist, writer, historian, researcher, teacher, artist and feminist campaigner.


Family life and education 
Susan (Sue) Innes was born 4 May 1948 in Weymouth, Dorset, the daughter of Jean Corbin, housewife, and Alec Innes, a professional gardener. She was raised in North Wales and in Peterhead, the hometown of her father.

She went to Peterhead Academy and to Gray's School of Art in Aberdeen, which she gave up in the late 1960s, travelling to San Francisco to join the hippy movement.

She became an activist in the second-wave feminist movement as she started studying English and philosophy at the University of St. Andrews in 1970. She was editor of the university newspaper Aien. In St. Andrews she met John (later Jo) Clifford, Scottish playwright and her lifelong partner. Sue Innes and Jo Clifford had two daughters in 1980 and 1985.

Career 
After her graduation, Sue Innes worked as a journalist to BBC Radio, The Scotsman and Scotland on Sunday.

She returned to Academia in 1993 and graduated from the University of Edinburgh in 1998 with a PhD in the areas of politics, history and sociology.

She published her book Making It Work: women, change and challenge in the 1990s in 1995.

She died on 24 February 2005, as the result of a brain tumour.

References 

1948 births
2005 deaths
British women activists
20th-century British journalists
20th-century British writers
British women journalists
British women's rights activists
People educated at Peterhead Academy
Alumni of the University of St Andrews
Alumni of the University of Edinburgh
20th-century British historians
20th-century British educators
Alumni of Gray's School of Art
Deaths from cancer in Scotland
Neurological disease deaths in Scotland
Deaths from brain tumor